The Honourable William Howard (c. 1674 – 18 July 1701) was an English Member of Parliament.

Howard was a younger son of the 2nd Earl of Carlisle, and brother of the 3rd Earl of Carlisle (who became First Lord of the Treasury in 1701). He entered Parliament in 1695 as member for Carlisle. At the general election in January 1701 he was elected for both Northumberland and Morpeth, choosing to sit for the former, but died later the same year.

References
 

1670s births
1701 deaths
William Howard (MP)
English MPs 1695–1698
English MPs 1698–1700
English MPs 1701